Rose Meza Harrison (born July 27, 1953) is a Democratic politician and Democratic nominee for U.S. Representative in the 27th Congressional District of Texas.

Personal life
Rose Meza Harrison was born in Benavides, Texas, a small ranching town in Duval County. Her father worked in the oilfields and was involved in drilling wells across the state for more than 20 years. Her mother stayed home to raise eight children and ensure that they received quality educations.

After divorce left her a single mother of three, Rose put herself through college, graduating Magna Cum Laude with a BA in Political Science from Texas A&M University-Corpus Christi. Once her youngest child graduated high school, she entered law school and earned a JD from Thurgood Marshall School of Law in 2003.

Political career
In 2007, Meza Harrison was appointed as the chair of the San Patricio County, Texas Democratic Party. In 2010, Rose decided to run in the election to become the chair of the Nueces County, Texas Democratic Party. During her run, she received support from her former constituents in San Patricio County.  She came in second during the primary behind Trina Garcia. Meza Harrison then went on to win the run-off, receiving 2,202 votes to Garcia's 1,883. While chair of Nueces County, Texas Democratic Party, she was outspoken against Republican candidates for using "bribery" to gain votes by handing out crackers, bottles of water and candy bars near polling places.

2012 election

In 2011, Rose decided to run for the 27th Congressional District seat, occupied by Blake Farenthold who defeated longtime incumbent Solomon P. Ortiz by 700 votes in the 2010 mid-term election. The interim maps drawn by the Federal District Court of Western Texas threw Harrison into a district centered in Brownsville. When the Supreme Court ordered the court to redraw the boundaries again, Harrison was once again face-to-face with Farenthold, running for Congress in a district based in Corpus Christi and Victoria.

Meza Harrison's campaign website shows she has been endorsed by National Nurses Organizing Committee of Texas (affiliate of National Nurses United),  the Service Employees International Union (SEIU), the United Association, Union Plumber, Fitters, Welders and HVAC Technicians (UA), the American Federation of Government Employees (AFGE) and the United Food and Commercial Workers Union (UFCW).

In the primary, held on May 29, 2012, Meza Harrison earned 33.7% of the vote to challenger Jerry J. Trevino's 42% leading to a runoff election. In the runoff, held July 31, 2012, Meza Harrison shocked many by winning a substantial 60% of the vote to Trevino's 40%. She lost the election to incumbent Blake Farenthold.

References

External links
 Official website

1953 births
Living people
American politicians of Mexican descent
People from Corpus Christi, Texas
Hispanic and Latino American women in politics
People from Duval County, Texas
Texas Democrats
21st-century American women